Thomas Burgh (25 January 1754 – 1832) was an Irish politician who was MP for Harristown in the Irish House of Commons (1775–1776 and 1783–1790) and Athy (1776–1783).

Biography
Burgh was educated at Trinity College, Dublin.

Burgh represented Harristown in the Irish House of Commons between 1775 and 1776, before sitting for Athy from 1776 to 1783. He then returned to representing Harristown between 1783 and 1790.

References

1754 births
1832 deaths
House of Burgh
Irish MPs 1769–1776
Irish MPs 1776–1783
Irish MPs 1783–1790
Members of the Parliament of Ireland (pre-1801) for County Kildare constituencies
Alumni of Trinity College Dublin